Débarquement Rock is an ice-free rock  long and 18.7 m high, marking the northern end of the Dumoulin Islands and the north-eastern end of the Geologie Archipelago.

History
The French Antarctic Expedition, 1837–40, under Captain Jules Dumont d'Urville landed on the western side of the highest of the westernmost rocky islets, to which he gave the name "Rocher du Débarquement". The landing was described by him as taking place on 21 January 1840 at 9 in the evening, though the actual date was 22 January 1840, since d'Urville had forgotten to add a day on his diary when he passed the 180° meridian from the east.

Identification of the islet with d'Urville's "Rocher du Débarquement" has been made on the basis of aerial photographs taken in the course of the US Navy's Operation Highjump (1946–1947), and of surveys and geological studies made by the French Antarctic Expedition in 1950–1952, with the seaward position of Débarquement Rock correlating with the feature named by d'Urville. Analysis of the geological samples brought back by the expedition indicates that the landing took place on one of the Dumoulin Islands (named by d'Urville in honour of the expedition hydrographer Clément Adrien Vincendon-Dumoulin), and the islet is, as described by d'Urville, the north-westernmost and highest of the group, similar in appearance from the west to that portrayed in illustrations contemporary with the original landing.

The islet was designated a historic site (HSM 81) following a proposal by France to the Antarctic Treaty Consultative Meeting.

References

 
 Voyage au Pôle sud et dans l'Océanie sur les corvettes "l'Astrolabe" et "la Zélée", exécuté par ordre du Roi pendant les années 1837-1838-1839-1840 sous le commandement de M. J. Dumont-d'Urville, capitaine de vaisseau, Paris, Gide éditeur, 1842-1846, tome 8, p. 148-152, site of Gallica : "Le canot de l'Astrolabe avait déjà pris beaucoup d'avance (...) et au bout de deux heures et demi, nous atteignîmes le plus rapproché des îlots aperçus. (...) en si peu de temps, une distance de plus de sept milles. (...) Il était près de neuf heures lorsque, à notre grande joie, nous prîmes terre sur la partie ouest de l’îlot le plus occidental et le plus élevé."
 Plates 168 to 171 of Voyage au Pôle sud et dans l'Océanie sur les corvettes "l'Astrolabe" et "la Zélée", site LINK Tasmania, Adelie Coast (Antarctica) - Pictorial works
 Documents of the Proposed registration of the Landing Rock on the list of historical sites and monuments, Site of Secretariat of the Antarctic Treaty, Antarctic Treaty, Documents Category : Historic Sites and Monuments, p. 3, ATCM XXIX
  Carte des explorations effectuées par les corvettes "l'Astrolabe" et "la Zélée" dans les régions circum-polaires, 1841 (plate of Voyage au Pôle sud et dans l'Océanie sur les corvettes "l'Astrolabe" et "la Zélée"), site of Secretariat of the Antarctic Treaty, Documents, Historic Sites and Monuments, enlarge to find the number 38 position of the ships before landing on Débarquement Rock more than 7 nautical miles southward (about 14 km), near the tongue of the Astrolabe Glacier called Pointe Géologie on the map.
  Map of Pointe Géologie archipelago, click on (+), site of Service Hydrographique et Océanographique de la Marine
  IGN Map of Pointe Géologie archipelago, site of Secretariat of the Antarctic Treaty, Documents, Historic Sites and Monuments
  The Dumoulin islands and Débarquement Rock in the Pilote de Terre Adélie, site of Secretariat of the Antarctic Treaty, Documents, Historic Sites and Monuments
  The Dumoulin islands by Dubouzet in 1840, site of Secretariat of the Antarctic Treaty, Documents, Historic Sites and Monuments
  Views of Débarquement Rock from north and south west, site of Secretariat of the Antarctic Treaty, Documents, Historic Sites and Monuments, length 244 m, height 18.7 m
  Prise de possession de la Terre Adélie (plate 171 of Voyage au Pôle sud et dans l'Océanie sur les corvettes "l'Astrolabe" et "la Zélée", view from the west), site of Secretariat of the Antarctic Treaty, Documents, Historic Sites and Monuments
  Photography of Débarquement Rock, site of Secretariat of the Antarctic Treaty, Documents, Historic Sites and Monuments
 Proposed registration of the Landing Rock on the list of historical sites and monuments, Antarctic Treaty Consultative meeting 2006, note 4
  PERROUD, Paul, Terre Adélie 1951-1952 – Astronomie, Géodésie, Cartographie, Expéditions Polaires Françaises, Résultats scientifiques, S. III.1, Paris 1955.

Rock formations of Adélie Land
Historic Sites and Monuments of Antarctica